Jason G. Howell is an American politician and a Republican member of the Kentucky Senate representing District 1.

Biography
Howell was born in Fulton, Kentucky. He earned his JD from the University of Kentucky College of Law, and his BA from The University of the South. He is married to Renee and they have three children. Howell worked as an attorney before entering politics.

In December 2019, Howell announced that he would be a candidate for the Kentucky State Senate in Kentucky's 1st State Senate district in 2020. Incumbent State Senator Stanley H. Humphries had announced that he would not be seeking re-election. The Republican primary for the seat was cancelled due to Howell being the only candidate.

He was elected unopposed in the November 3, 2020 general election. He was sworn into office on January 1, 2021.

Electoral history

References

External links
Jason Howell (Kentucky) at Ballotpedia
Senator Jason Howell (R) at Kentucky Senate
Official website

Living people
Year of birth missing (living people)
Place of birth missing (living people)
21st-century American politicians
Republican Party Kentucky state senators
University of Kentucky College of Law alumni
Sewanee: The University of the South alumni